Marisabina Russo (née Stark; born 1 May 1950) is a children's book author and illustrator.  She has written and illustrated over twenty books for children and young adults. Her most notable books include The Line Up Book (winner of the IRA Children’s Book Award) and Always Remember Me (an ALA Notable Book).

She was born in New York City and graduated from Mount Holyoke College with BA in Studio Art in 1971. She began her career as a freelance illustrator. Her work appeared frequently in The New Yorker and included several covers. She then went on to illustrate a book of poetry for children, Vacation Time by Nikki Giovanni. She started publishing her own stories with Greenwillow Books in 1986. 
Russo’s books come from her own childhood memories and her experiences as a mother. Her illustrations, painted in gouache, are colorful and two-dimensional, reminiscent of folk art. More recently, Ms. Russo has written young adult novels.

Her books have also been translated into Korean and Japanese. She has published with Greenwillow Books, Simon & Schuster, Random House and Harcourt, Brace. Her picture book Sophie Sleeps Over will be published by Roaring Brook Press in March 2014.

External links
Marisabina Russo's official website

American children's writers
Mount Holyoke College alumni
Living people
1950 births
People from New York City